The women's 100 metres hurdles at the 2007 All-Africa Games were held on July 19–20.

Medalists

Results

Heats
Qualification: First 3 of each heat (Q) and the next 2 fastest (q) qualified for the final.

Wind:Heat 1: -0.5 m/s, Heat 2: -0.5 m/s

Final
Wind: +1.3 m/s

References
Results

100